
Datha may refer to:

Places 
 Datha State, a non-salute Rajput princely state and its seat on the Bagad river in Kathiawar, Gujarat, India
 Datha island in Beaufort County, South Carolina, site of Sams Plantation Complex Tabby Ruins

Persons 
 a paramount native Indian chief of Cofitachequi in South Carolina, named by Spanish explorer Francisco de Chicora; cfr. the above island

Religion
 one of eight theerthas at the Jharasangam Shiva temple

Fiction
 Datha-giri alias Yawana, the Burmese equivalent of Ravana in the Ramayana